O Zambezi is the fifth studio album by New Zealand  rock band, Dragon.  It was produced by Peter Dawkins and was released in September 1978 on vinyl and re-released on CD in 1988. The album peaked at number 3 on the Australian Kent Music Report which remains the band's highest charting album in that country. The album was certified platinum in Australia.

In October 2010, the album was listed in the book 100 Best Australian Albums, despite being released by a New Zealand band.

Track listing
"O Zambezi" (Robert Taylor) - 4:30
"Still in Love with You" (Paul Hewson) - 3:24
"Are You Old Enough?" (Paul Hewson) - 4:07
"Politics" (Jenny Hunter-Brown, Robert Taylor, Todd Hunter) - 3:58
"Reach the Top" (Marc Hunter, Robert Taylor) - 4:04
"Civilization" (Paul Hewson) - 3:59
"Midnight Groovies" (Paul Hewson) - 3:19
"One Look Across the Water" (Robert Taylor) - 3:16
"Company" (Jenny Hunter-Brown, Todd Hunter) - 3:55
"Burn Down the Bridges" (Marc Hunter) - 3:23

Charts

Certifications

Personnel 
 Bass Guitar, Vocals – Todd Hunter
 Drums – Kerry Jacobson
 Keyboards, Vocals – Paul Hewson
 Guitar, Vocals – Robert Taylor
 Lead Vocals – Marc Hunter
 Violin [Vitar] – Richard Lee
Production
 Management – Sebastian Chase
 Photography By – Graeme Webber
 Producer – Peter Dawkins
 Remix – Howard Steele
 Engineer – Ric Curtin
 Engineer [2nd Engineer, Remix] –Tim Dennen
 Arranged By [Strings], Conductor [Strings] – Adrian Scott
 Cover – Ian McCausland

References

1978 albums
Dragon (band) albums
Portrait Records albums
Rock albums by New Zealand artists
Albums produced by Peter Dawkins (musician)